Calculator was an American emo band from Westchester, Los Angeles, California.

History
Calculator self-released a split with the band Moldar in mid-2009. Later that year, Calculator released their first full-length album titled These Roots Grow Deep on Melotov Records. Calculator released a 7" in 2011 titled New Forms. In 2014, Calculator signed with Count Your Lucky Stars Records and released their second full-length album titled This Will Come To Pass. In June 2014, Calculator was featured on a four-way split titled The Sound Of Young America with the bands Capacities, Innards, and Itto. In late 2014, Calculator released an EP on Count Your Lucky Stars titled Calc.

References

Emo musical groups from California
Musical groups from Los Angeles
Count Your Lucky Stars Records artists